Sunderland A.F.C. Academy is the collective name for the youth development squads of Sunderland Association Football Club, primarily the U18 and U21 teams. Sunderland have an 'Elite' Category 1 football academy based on the Elite Player Performance Plan and their teams are members of the Professional Development League.

Sunderland's academy is based at the Academy of Light in Cleadon, South Tyneside. Sunderland academy teams play at the Eppleton Colliery Welfare Ground, in Hetton-le-Hole (U21s) or at the Academy of Light (U18s). At least three U21 games per season are played at Stadium of Light as per the rules of the Professional Development League.

Numerous notable professional players have graduated from Sunderland's youth system over the years. In recent seasons, Jordan Henderson and Jordan Pickford have both represented England at senior international level. and Lynden Gooch has been capped for the United States.

History
While second-string teams date back to the earliest years of the club, as the senior team gained entry to the Football League, they began to submit a reserve team in competitive competitions under the name Sunderland 'A'. The A team enlisted in both the Durham Challenge Cup and the Northern Football Alliance in 1890.

Leagues 
The 'A' team won the inaugural Alliance in 1891 and dominated the early years of the league, winning five out of the first six seasons. They competed in the Alliance until 1902. In 1906 they joined the new North Eastern League along with reserve teams from Newcastle United, Middlesbrough and Bradford City. Sunderland finished second to Newcastle United 'A' in their first two seasons, and won the league for the first time in 1925. Sunderland went on to win it a further nine times, second only to Middlesbrough. The North East's league teams withdrew their reserve teams from the North Eastern League in 1958. Sunderland and Middlesbrough both joined the North Regional League. Sunderland won it once and came second three times before the league disbanded in 1969. Sunderland bid to join The Central League in 1970, but were unsuccessful after only receiving four votes.

Sunderland Reserves played a single season in the Wearside Football League in 1979–80, before joining The Central League in 1983.

Sunderland won the Central League once, in the 1998–99 season under the management of Adrian Heath. It was their final season in a competition that was then called the Pontins League Championship. In that season, a crowd of 33,513 at the Stadium of Light watched Sunderland Reserves beat Liverpool 1-0 - an all-time record attendance for the Central League.In 1997, Sunderland joined the FA Premier Youth League, for the U18s teams of Premier League. Sunderland finished second in the North section. A year later, the league was renamed the FA Premier Academy League, was split into U19s and U17s divisions, and expanded to include selected academies from Football League teams. Sunderland fielded teams in all six seasons of this incarnation. In 2004, the league was restructured again, renamed the Premier Academy League, and reset to U18s only. Sunderland's best performance was in 2006–07 - they won group D, beat Manchester City in the Play-Off Semi-Final, but lost on penalties to Leicester City in the final. The Sunderland side included Jordan Henderson, Jack Colback and Martyn Waghorn.

Meanwhile, in 1999, Sunderland left the Central League as Champions and joined the newly formed Premier Reserve League aimed at U21 / Reserve teams of Premier League teams. They went on to win the Northern section in 2002–03, and again in 2008–09. By 2009, the winners of the North and South sections had a play-off to determine a 'National Champion'; Sunderland lost the final to Aston Villa.

Cups 
Sunderland 'A' won the Durham Challenge Cup for the first time in 1894. They went on to dominate the cup in the 1900s, winning it six out of seven seasons. They remain the most successful team in the competition, having won it 21 times in total. Sunderland continue to field a team in the competition.

In 1952, the FA Youth Cup was formed, aimed at offering competitive games for youth players unable to break into senior teams. Sunderland had success in the competition in the 1960s, losing to Arsenal in the 1966 final, before beating Birmingham City in the final the following year, and West Bromwich Albion in the 1969 final. The 1967 team included Billy Hughes and the 1969 team included Richie Pitt, both of whom would go on to play for the senior team in the 1973 FA Cup Final.

In 1996, the Central League Cup was introduced to give U21 teams a cup competition in parallel to the FA Youth Cup. Sunderland won the cup twice, in 2009 and 2011, before switching to the Premier League Cup in 2013.

Academy Formation 
In 2002, the Academy of Light was completed and inauguration took place with England manager Sven-Göran Eriksson. The Academy was a state-of-the-art £15m facility in South Tyneside, which doubled as the training location for the senior team. It opened officially the following year. The centre was designed to comply with UEFA five-star academy status.

In 2003, Kees Zwamborn was hired as Academy director. Zwamborn had been youth director at AFC Ajax, a club acclaimed for its youth development. He lasted just 14 months in the role, as Sunderland underwent a period of turmoil on and off the field. He was replaced with Ged McNamee. who remained in the role until 2016.

Post EPPP Restructuring 

The Elite Player Performance Plan (EPPP) was introduced in 2011 and restructured the way youth development operated in England. Academies were graded into tiers, based on a variety of factors, including the quality of the facilities available. Category 1 (Elite) was the highest rating. Academy teams would play against teams in the same academy category. Sunderland were awarded Category 1 status.

Sunderland's Category 1 status allowed them to join the inaugural U21 Premier League and U18 Premier League seasons in 2012–13. Sunderland's best finish in the U21 Premier League was in 2015–16 when they finished runner-up to Manchester United. Their success in that season meant they qualified for the Premier League International Cup. They competed in 2016–17, beating U21 teams from S.L. Benfica, PSV Eindhoven, Athletic Bilbao and Norwich City on their way to the final. They faced FC Porto at the Stadium of Light, losing 5–0 in front of a crowd of over 18,000. Sunderland's best U18 Premier League finish was in 2015–16 when they finished fifth.

In 2016–17, the U21 Premier League was rebranded Premier League 2, and was widened to U23 level. A second division was added, with Promotion and relegation between the two. Sunderland finished seventh in the first season of the Premier League 2, but finished second bottom (ahead of Manchester United) in the 2017–18 season, and were relegated to Division 2.

Sunderland A.F.C. Under 21s

Previously called Sunderland 'A', Sunderland II, Sunderland Reserves and Sunderland U23s, the Sunderland U21 team is the second team of Sunderland A.F.C. and the most senior team in the club's academy system. U21 matchday squads may include up to five outfield players and one goalkeeper over the age of 21; this may include players from the senior team in need of game time.

Sunderland U21s play in Division 2 of the Premier League 2 following relegation from Division 1 in the 2017–18 season. They finished fifth in the 2020–21 season, beat Stoke City in the play-off semi-final, but lost on penalties to Crystal Palace in the final after a 0-0 draw. They represent Sunderland in the Durham Challenge Cup, a competition that the club (originally as the senior team, but from 1894-onwards as the reserve team) have won a record 21 times. They shared the trophy with Spennymoor Town in 2020 after the final was cancelled due to the COVID-19 pandemic. It was the first victory in the trophy for Sunderland as the previously called U23's. They also take part in the Premier League Cup, though have yet to progress beyond the Round-of-16 stage.

Sunderland U21s (effectively the previously called U23s team) also took part in two seasons of the EFL Trophy against senior professional teams from the bottom two divisions of the English Football League. In the 2016–17 competition, Sunderland qualified from their group after victories over Hartlepool United and Notts County but were beaten in the first knockout stage by the academy of Wolves. In the 2017–18 competition, Sunderland failed to qualify from their group. They were unable to take part in the 2018–19 competition as the senior team were competing in the competition for the first time after relegation to EFL League One. Following the promotion of the senior team via the League One Play-off to the EFL Championship the format was changed from U23s to U21s and now allows U21s matchday squads to include up to five outfield players and one goalkeeper over the age of 21; this may include players from the senior team in need of game time.

Current squad

Honours 
Northern Football Alliance (5)
Winners as Sunderland 'A: 1891, 1893, 1894, 1895, 1896
Durham Challenge Cup (18)
Winners as Sunderland 'A''': 1894, 1901, 1902, 1903, 1904, 1906, 1907, 1912, 1913, 1919, 1922, 1923, 1925, 1928, 1929Winners as Sunderland Reserves: 1966, 2008Winners as Sunderland U23s: 2020
North Eastern League (9)Winners as Sunderland 'A: 1925, 1927, 1928, 1929, 1930, 1934, 1937Winners as Sunderland II: 1948, 1953
North Regional League (1)Winners as Sunderland Reserves:1969
 The Central League (1)Winners as Sunderland Reserves: 1999
Premier Reserve League Northern Division (2)Winners as Sunderland Reserves: 2003, 2009
 Central League Cup (2)Winners as Sunderland Reserves:: 2009, 2011

Post EPPP:

U21 Premier LeagueRunner-up: 2016
Premier League International Cup:Runner-up: 2017

Sunderland A.F.C. Under 18s

Previously called Sunderland Youths, Sunderland U17s and Sunderland U19s, the Sunderland U18s team is the third team of Sunderland A.F.C. and the club's senior youth team. Dating back to the 1950s, the team consists of players beyond school-age on youth contracts. Youth players can be promoted into the U21 or senior teams, but due to EPPP rules, will still remain on youth contracts.

Sunderland U18s play in the Category 1 North section of U18 Premier League. They finished bottom of the league in the 2020-21 season. They also compete in the FA Youth Cup, a competition Sunderland have won twice. They play their home games at the Academy of Light.

Current squad

 Honours 
 FA Youth Cup (2)Winners: 1967, 1969
 Runner-up: 1966
 Premier Academy League
 Runner-up: 2007

 Notable Youth & Academy Graduates 
Selected players who came through Sunderland youth system.1966 onwards''

 Stan Anderson
 Jim McNab
 Jimmy Montgomery
 Billy Hughes
 Colin Todd
 Richie Pitt
 Dave Elliott
 Micky Horswill
 Gary Rowell
 Kevin Arnott
 Gordon Chisholm
 Colin West
 Nick Pickering
 Barry Venison
 John Cornforth
 Barry Richardson
 Gordon Armstrong
 Gary Owers
 Brian Atkinson
 Kieron Brady
 Michael Gray
 David Preece
 Paul Heckingbottom
 Darren Holloway
 Michael Bridges
 Paul Thirlwell
 Michael Proctor
 Brendan McGill
 Thomas Butler
 Kevin Kyle
 George McCartney
 Gerard Williams
 Cliff Byrne
 Chris Brown
 Richie Ryan
 Lee Robinson
 Grant Leadbitter
 Ben Alnwick
 Peter Hartley
 Jack Colback
 Jordan Cook
 Martyn Waghorn
 Jordan Henderson
 Ryan Noble
 Conor Hourihane
 Blair Adams
 Liam Noble
 John Egan
 Louis Laing
 Jak Alnwick
 Mikael Mandron
 George Honeyman
 Jordan Pickford
 Lynden Gooch
 Ethan Robson
 Josh Maja
 Joel Asoro
 Bali Mumba
 Andrew Nelson
 Tom Beadling
 Michael Ledger
 Luke Molyneux
 Max Stryjek

Notes 

A. : Trophy was shared with Spennymoor Town after the final was cancelled due to the COVID 19 Pandemic.

References

Sunderland A.F.C.
Sunderland
Premier League International Cup